The 1966 Far East Circuit was the fifth season of golf tournaments that comprised the Far East Circuit, later known as the Asia Golf Circuit.

Taiwan joined the circuit in 1966, bringing the number of tournaments to seven. However later in the season it was announced that the Philippine Open would not count for the Dunlop sponsored overall circuit prize, so the number of counting events remained at six.

Lu Liang-Huan of Taiwan was the overall circuit champion.

Schedule
The table below shows the 1966 Far East Circuit schedule. There was one change from the previous season as the circuit expanded to seven tournaments with the addition of the Republic of China Open.

Final standings
The Far East Circuit standings were based on a points system.

References

Far East Circuit
Asia Golf Circuit